Helge Jörns (born 18 March 1941) is a German composer and music educator.

Life 
Born in Mannheim, the son of the composer Helmuth Jörns, he spent his childhood and early youth in Mannheim. From 1956 until his Abitur in 1962, he worked as organist and cantor in Alsfeld in Hesse. Until 1966, he studied at the Hochschule für Musik Detmold Composition and conducting as well as at the Tonmeisterinstitut with the main instrumental subjects piano and cello.

In 1966, he moved to Berlin and studied musicology at the Technical University of Berlin until 1971.

In 1978, he moved to the Bischöfliche Kirchenmusikhochschule Berlin (Department of Church Music of the Archdiocese of Berlin) as a lecturer in composition, a post he held until 1988. Guest professorships also took him to Melbourne, Sydney, Helsinki, Istanbul and Ankara.

From 1994 to 1997, he worked as 1st sound engineer at Deutschlandfunk Kultur and since then has devoted himself exclusively to composing.

Awards and prizes 
, Deutsche Akademie Rom Villa Massimo, Rostrum of Composers (UNESCO), Deutscher Schallplattenpreis, Ford Foundation.

Work 
 Europe and the Bull (1988), opera in 2 parts (18 singers, choir, orchestra); first performance: 17 August 1988 Berlin; Ms. ((Mv. Intermezzo)); S: CD, collegno; Note: new version 1999
 Der Aquädukt (1987), scenic oratorio (solos, choir, orchestra); WP: 1990 Vienna; Ms. (composer's publication mat.); B: ZDF and ORT Ms. and Sdg.; Note: edited by Maximilian Kolbe.
 Spiel von Liebe und Zufall (1991), opera in 3 acts (solos and orchestra); first performance: 1993 Schwetzingen/Karlsruhe; Ms. ((Mv. Intermezzo); B: DAT at Süddeutscher Rundfunk.
 The Marrakech Cat fantastic opera in five parts for children from 8 to 88 (solos, choir, ballet and orchestra); WP: 1994/95 Halle, Saale; Ms. (Mv. Intermezzo)); B: U-MATIC, Fs
 Trio 1991,(Symphony No. 1) Ow. (Wind Quintet, String Quintet, Orchestra); First performance: 1992 Berliner Philharmoniker; Ms. (composer's recording mat.); B: DAT Berliner Philharmonisches Orchester
 Concerto grosso Ow. (wind quintet and orchestra); First performance: 1998 Schwerin; Ms. ((Mv. Intermezzo)); B: DLR (DAT)
 Dezett, Kmk. (Fl., 2 Ob., 2 Kl., 2 Rg., 2 Hn., Kb.); First performance: 1994 Moscow; Ms. (publication mat. with the composer); B: DAT with SDR
 Florindo and the unknown, burlesque opera in 3 parts, original libretto: Hugo von Hofmannsthal, 2.2.2.2.- 4.3.3.1.,timpani,percussion,strings,MCh,solos (Mv. Intermezzo)
 String trios, string quartets; piano quartets; solo concerts 3 x violin, 1 x cello, 1 harpsichord, 1 violin, 1 flute; piano quintet;
 Per un poc di pace, cantata, premiere: 1978 Berlin, Sing-Akademie zu Berlin, Philharmonie Berlin
 Jewish Friends, cantata
 3 symphonies; 4 operas; solo and chamber music; piano Lieder;
 Ein Liebeslied der Alma
 Chorwerke, masses

References

External links 
 
 

German composers
20th-century  classical composers
1941 births
Living people
Musicians from Mannheim